The apartment building at 116 Spruce Street in Missoula, Montana was built between 1902 and 1911.  It was listed on the National Register of Historic Places in 1990.

References

National Register of Historic Places in Missoula, Montana
Queen Anne architecture in Montana
Residential buildings completed in 1902
1902 establishments in Montana
Residential buildings on the National Register of Historic Places in Montana